Reginald the Vampire is an American comedy horror television series which premiered on Syfy on October 5, 2022. The series stars Jacob Batalon as Reginald Andres. In January 2023, the series was renewed for a second season.

Cast and characters 
 Jacob Batalon as Reginald Andres
 Mandela Van Peebles as Maurice Miller
 Em Haine as Sarah Kinney
 Georgia Waters as Penelope
 Marguerite Hanna as Ashley
 Aren Buchholz as Todd
 Savannah Basley as Angela
 Sean Yves Lessard as Lebron

Episodes

Production

Development
On August 5, 2021, it was announced that Syfy had ordered a ten episode contemporary adaptation of Johnny B. Truant's Fat Vampire book series.

On January 15, 2023, Syfy renewed the series for a second season.

Reception
The review aggregator website Rotten Tomatoes reports a 70% approval rating with an average rating of 6.7/10, based on 10 critic reviews. The website's critics consensus reads, "Reginald doesn't particularly stand out in the already crowded vampire genre, but Jacob Batalon invests his hapless protagonist with enough charm to make this spunky series worth a bite."

Metacritic, which uses a weighted average, assigned a score of 63 out of 100 based on 7 critics, indicating "generally favorable reviews".The website's highest scoring critics' reviews were from Collider'''s Maggie Boccella who wrote "Those who enjoyed Warehouse 13 or the American version of Being Human growing up will certainly love the quirkiness Reginald the Vampire has to offer, and if given a Season 2, the series could only serve to grow, embracing its human characters as much as its undead ones"; Robert Lloyd of the Los Angeles Times wrote "Feels like a kind of tonal companion piece to Syfy's great Resident Alien, with its winning combination of comedy, suspense, likable characters and real feeling"; Alexis Gunderson of Consequence who wrote "Its pacing could be more consistent, both in the macro sense (e.g., how the mythology all fits together) and the micro (e.g., where and how specific punchlines land). That said, if you're looking for a spooky season show to decompress with on a weekly basis, or a fun, low-stakes binge to save up for Halloween weekend, Reginald the Vampire is your man."; and Joel Keller of  Decider'' who wrote "The first episode is more heartfelt than hilarious, but there's enough of the former for us to forgive the lack of the latter."

References

External links
 
 

2020s American comedy-drama television series
2022 American television series debuts
English-language television shows
Syfy original programming
Television series about vampires